Bryan Bergougnoux (born 12 January 1983) is a French professional football manager and former player who is the head coach of Championnat National 2 club Thonon Evian. As a player, he was a midfielder.

Club career 
Born in Lyon, Bergougnoux began his career at his hometown club Lyon, where he was formed since a young age. His debut for the club came in a 2–0 defeat to Lens on 28 July 2001.

After 36 games for Lyon, in which he scored four goals, he was sold to Toulouse in 2005 for €3.5 million, on a four-year deal.

In August 2009, after his Toulouse contract had expired, he signed a three-year contract with  Lecce of the Italian Serie B.

On 26 January 2012, he officially became a player of the Cyprus club AC Omonia, with that club having the rights to transfer him to Nicosia from June.

In September 2012, Bergougnoux joined Tours on a one-year contract with an option for two further seasons. In July 2017, he agreed a contract extension until summer 2019 with the club.

In August 2018, Bergougnoux took up a dual role as player and coach at lower league side Thonon Evian.

International career
Bergougnoux was a member of the France U21, for which he played 21 games and scored 10 goals.

Honours

Player 
Lyon
Ligue 1: 2003–04, 2004–05
Trophée des Champions: 2003, 2004

Omonia
Cypriot Cup: 2011–12

Manager 
Thonon Evian

 Championnat National 3: 2021–22

References

External links

1984 births
Footballers from Lyon
Living people
Association football forwards
French footballers
France youth international footballers
France under-21 international footballers
Olympique Lyonnais players
Toulouse FC players
AC Omonia players
U.S. Lecce players
LB Châteauroux players
Tours FC players
Thonon Evian Grand Genève F.C. players
Ligue 1 players
Ligue 2 players
Serie B players
Cypriot First Division players
Expatriate footballers in Italy
Expatriate footballers in Cyprus
French football managers
Thonon Evian Grand Genève F.C. managers
Thonon Evian Grand Genève F.C. non-playing staff
Championnat National 3 managers